"Call Me (Come Back Home)" (known as simply "Call Me") is a song by Al Green, released in 1973 as a single from his album Call Me. It peaked at number ten on the Billboard Hot 100 and number two on the R&B singles chart. It was certified gold by the RIAA.

References

External links
 List of cover versions of "Call Me (Come Back Home)" at SecondHandSongs.com

1973 singles
Al Green songs
1973 songs
Songs written by Al Green
Songs written by Al Jackson Jr.
Songs written by Willie Mitchell (musician)